Adoryphorus is a genus of beetles belonging to the family Scarabaeidae.

The species of this genus are found in Australia and Malesia.

Species:

Adoryphorus canei 
Adoryphorus coulonii 
Adoryphorus mellori

References

Scarabaeidae